Kudumba Vilakku is a 1956 Indian Tamil-language drama film directed by F. Nagoor. The film stars P. V. Narasimha Bharathi and Jamuna.

Plot 
Radha is the wife of Kanagasabai, a Zamindar. The couple have no children. Kanagasabai brings in another woman, Pushpa, as his second wife with Radha's consent. In the meantime, Radha gets pregnant. Pushpa and her uncle Appasami try to abort the baby, but Radha safely delivers a boy. While Radha is in a delirious state, Pushpa and Appasami hand over the baby to a servant, Gopal and order him to kill it. But Gopal takes it to the next village and dumps the baby in a garbage bin. Kaathaan comes to clear the bin and finds the baby. He and his wife Pechi decide to bring up the baby, name him Marudhan and move on to the Zamindar's village in order to escape from neighbours' prying eyes.

Peychi gets employed as a servant in the zamin bungalow. She takes the baby with her. Radha becomes fond of the baby.Pushpa and Appasami poison the  zamindar's mind and make him chase Radha out of the house. Kaathaan's hut is also burnt. While going aimlessly on the road in another village, Radha picks up a girl child, Kannamma.  Kaathaan and Peychi also comes and settles down in the same village. Years roll by. Marudhan becomes a building contractor.

Radha works as a labourer in a building. One day she slips and fall down. Marudhan takes her to her home and meets Kannamma. As Radha is injured, Kannamma goes to work in the building. Marudhan and Kannamma become lovers. When Kaathaan and Peychi learn of their love, they go to Kannamma's house to arrange the marriage. When they met Radha there, they are shocked. But Radha explains that Kannamma is her adopted daughter. Radha tells them her full story. Marudhan gets angry and goes to zamindar's house to settle affairs. After chasing Radha, Pushpa takes control of the zamin and imprisons Kanagasabai. But he manages to escape. Pushpa sends Appasami to find and bring back Kanagasabai. Appasami finds Kanagasabai and tries to get hold of him. In the nick of time, Marudhan comes to the spot and rescues Kanagasabai. He takes him to the zamin bungalow. When Marudhan argues with Pushpa, she suspects that he may know the full story. So he plans to kill him. In the meantime, Kathan meets Gopal and takes him to his house. Gopal explains what happened. So Radha discovers that Marudhan is her own son. All of them goes to the zamindar's house. How the problems are solved forms the rest of the story.

Cast 
List adapted from the film's song book.

Male cast
 P. V. Narasimhabharathi as Marudhan
 M. G. Chakrapani as Kanagasabai
 N. S. Krishnan as Kathan
 T. S. Durairaj as Appasami
 K. A. Thangavelu as Vajravelu
 T. V. Sethuraman as Sukku
 M. S. Thirupathisami as Gopal
 Master Vijayakumar as Baby Marudhan

Female cast
 M. V. Rajamma as Radha
 N. Jamuna as Kannamma
 K. Lakshmikantham as Pushpa
 T. A. Mathuram as Pechi
 Geetha as Mangu
 Seetha as Sundari
 Kumari Padmini as Baby Kannamma

Dance
 Rajasulochana
 Kusalakumari
 E. V. Saroja
 Rajam Sisters

Production 
The film was produced and directed by F. Nagoor under his own banner Nagoor Cine Productions. A. K. Velan, C. K. T. Rajan and Kangeyan wrote the screenplay and dialogues. V. Kumaradevan did the cinematography supervised by Jiten Bannerji while P. V. Narayanan did the editing. Audiography was done by M. V. Karunakaran supervised by Dhinsha K. Tehrani. Art direction was by N. Kuppusamy and Chinnilal and Sampathkumar handled the choreography. Still photography was done by K. Rathinavelu. The film was shot at Neptune Studios.

The film was also produced in Malayalam with the title Graha Devatha.

Soundtrack 
Music was composed by T. R. Pappa while the lyrics were penned by Maruthakasi, Kambadasan, Purakshidasan, Subbu Arumugam and N. S. Krishnan.

References

External links 
 

1950s Tamil-language films
1956 drama films
Films scored by T. R. Pappa
Indian black-and-white films
Indian drama films